Mitja Gasparini (born 26 June 1984) is a Slovenian volleyball player who plays for Iranian side Foolad Sirjan. With the Slovenian national team, he won a silver medal at the 2015 and 2019 editions of the European Championship.

Sporting achievements

Club
 CEV Cup
  2006–07 – with Autocommerce Bled

 National championships
 2005–06  Slovenian Championship, with Autocommerce Bled
 2006–07  Slovenian Championship, with Autocommerce Bled
 2007–08  Slovenian Championship, with ACH Volley
 2008–09  Slovenian Championship, with ACH Volley
 2015–16  French Championship, with Paris Volley
 2016–17  South Korean Championship, with Incheon Korean Air Jumbos
 2017–18  South Korean Championship, with Incheon Korean Air Jumbos
 2018–19  South Korean Championship, with Incheon Korean Air Jumbos

Individual awards
 2014: Italian Championship – Best Server
 2015: Italian Championship – Best Server

References

External links

 
 Player profile at LegaVolley.it 
 Player profile at PlusLiga.pl 
 Player profile at Volleybox.net 

1984 births
Living people
People from Izola
Slovenian men's volleyball players
Slovenian expatriate sportspeople in Greece
Expatriate volleyball players in Greece
Slovenian expatriate sportspeople in Poland
Expatriate volleyball players in Poland
Slovenian expatriate sportspeople in Italy
Expatriate volleyball players in Italy
Slovenian expatriate sportspeople in South Korea
Expatriate volleyball players in South Korea
Slovenian expatriate sportspeople in France
Expatriate volleyball players in France
Slovenian expatriate sportspeople in Japan
Expatriate volleyball players in Japan
Slovenian expatriate sportspeople in Iran
Expatriate volleyball players in Iran
Iraklis V.C. players
Jastrzębski Węgiel players
Blu Volley Verona players
Cheonan Hyundai Capital Skywalkers players
Paris Volley players
Incheon Korean Air Jumbos players
Opposite hitters